Mark Owen-Taylor (born 27 January 1962) is an Australian actor, who has also worked variously as a narrator and voice-over  He was best known for his role as school teacher Peter Manning in A Country Practice in 1986–1987, appearing for 88 episodes and replaced Robert Hughes as the star of Hey Dad! for its final two seasons in 1993–1994. He has appeared in numerous serials including Heartbreak High, Water Rats and All Saints, as well appearing in numerous theatre productions.

Select credits
Flowers of Rethymnon (1986)
Act of Necessity (1991)
E Street (1991)
Hey Dad! (1993–94)
Cybergirl as Hugh Campbell (2001–02)
 A Country Practice

References

External links

1962 births
20th-century Australian male actors
Living people
Australian male television actors